Articles (arranged alphabetically) related to Algeria include:

A
Abane Ramdane -
Abd al-Qadir al-Jaza'iri -
Abd al-Rahman al-Tha'alibi -
Abdelbaki Sahraoui -
Abdelhafid Khatib -
Abdelkader Alloula -
 -
 -
 -
Abderrahmane Benhamida -
Abderrahmane Boushaki -
 -
Abderrahmane Farès -
Abderrahmane Hammad -
Abderrahman Ibrir -
Adel Djerrar -
Adherbal (king of Numidia) -
Adrar Province, Algeria -
Aghlabid -
Ahaggar Mountains -
Ahd 54 -
Ahmad Baba Rachid -
Ahmed Bourenane -
Ahmed Hadhoum -
 -
Ahmed Mahsas -
Ahmed Ressam -
Ahmed Zaoui -
Ahmed Zouaoui -
Ain Defla -
Ain Temouchent -
Ain Zaatout -
Air Algérie -
Air Algérie Flight 6289 -
Albert Camus -
Alcan in Africa -
Algerian Communist Party -
Algerian Franco-Muslim Rally -
Algeria at the 2004 Summer Olympics -
Algeria national football team -
Algerian Civil War -
Algerian Constitution -
Algerian Cup -
Algerian dinar -
Algerian Family Code -
Algerian Football Federation -
Algerian hip hop -
Algerian legislative elections, 1997 -
Algerian local elections, 1990 -
Algerian National Assembly elections, 1991 -
Algerian National Front -
Algerian Party for Democracy and Socialism -
Algerian presidential election, 2004 -
Algerian presidential elections, 1995 -
Algerian War of Independence -
Algerian wine -
Algerianist -
Algiers -
 -
Ali ben El-Haffaf -
Ali Boushaki -
Ali Laskri -
Ali Rial -
Almohad -
Almoravides -
Al-Qabail Mountains -
Allahu Akbar (Matoub) -
Amenokal -
Amguid crater -
Amine ibn El Boushaki -
Andalusi nubah -
Annaba -
Annaba Province -
Annaba University -
Anzad -
Arak gorges -
Archeology of Algeria -
Salim Aribi -
Armed Islamic Group -
Armée de l'Air (Part III: End of empire in Indochina and Algeria, 1939-1962) -
Abbas Aroua -
Arouch -
Aterian -
Atlas Mountains -
Augustine of Hippo -
Aurès Mountains -
Paul Aussaresses -
Aziz

B
Bachir Boudjelid -
Bahmer -
Bas Saharan Basin -
Battle of Algiers (disambiguation) -
Battle of Alma -
Battle of the Col des Beni Aïcha -
Batna -
Batna Province -
Battle of Zama -
Béchar Province -
Djamel Beghal -
Mohammed Bedjaoui -
Belaïd Abrika -
Belaid Abdessalam -
 -
Krim Belkacem -
Abdelaziz Belkhadem -
Larbi Belkheir -
Djamel Belmadi -
Samir Beloufa -
Ahmed Ben Bella -
Ahmed Benbitour -
Chadli Bendjedid -
Ali Benflis -
Mohamed Benhamou -
Beni Ounif massacre -
Beni-Ali massacre -
Beni-Messous massacre -
Bentalha massacre -
Béjaïa -
Béjaïa Province -
Belisarius -
Berber -
Berberism -
Berber music -
Berber languages -
Berrouaghia prison massacre -
Bilal Tarikat -
Biskra -
Biskra Province -
Rabah Bitat -
Blida -
Bocchus II -
Bordj Bou Arreridj -
Bordj Bou Arreridj Province -
Ahmed Bouchiki -
Fatiha Boudiaf -
Muhammad Boudiaf -
Boudouaou -
Bouira -
Fouad Boulemia -
Houari Boumédienne -
Houari Boumedienne Airport -
Boumerdes -
Mansour Boutabout -
Abdelaziz Bouteflika -
Mustafa Bouyali -
Brahim Boushaki -
Brahim Zafour -
Abdelhamid Brahimi -
Thomas Bugeaud
Zighen Aym

C
Capsian culture -
Casbah -
Censorship in Algeria -
Chakib Khelil -
Chaoui -
Chaouia language -
Charter for Peace and National Reconciliation -
Cheb Hasni -
Chenoua -
Chenouas -
Chenoua language -
Cherchell -
Abdelmalek Cherrad -
Chief of Staff of the People's National Army -
Chlef -
Chott -
Hélène Cixous -
Bertrand Clauzel -
Cleopatra Selene (II) -
Colonel Amirouche -
Colonial heads of Algeria -
Colonial heads of Oran -
Communications in Algeria -
Constantine, Algeria -
COVID-19 pandemic in Algeria

D
 -
 -
Dairat Labguer massacre -
Defectors from the French army to the ALN -
Dellys -
Democratic Union of the Algerian Manifesto -
Demographics of Algeria -
Jacques Derrida -
Mourad Dhina
Mohammed Dib -
Abdallah Djaballah -
Djanet -
Tahar Djaout -
Assia Djebar -
Djelfa -
Djelfa Province -
Djezzy GSM -
Donatist -
Drusilla of Mauretania

F
Farès Fellahi -
Faouzi Chaouchi -
Farid Ishak Boushaki -
Farouk Belkaïd -
Fatma Zohra Zamoum -
Fatma n Soumer -
Ferhat Abbas -
Firmus -
First Barbary War -
Flag of Algeria -
Foreign relations of Algeria -
Fossatum Africae -
Frantz Fanon -
French rule in Algeria -
Friends of the Manifesto and Liberty

G
Gaetulia -
Lounès Gaouaoui -
Geiseric -
Gemellae -
General Union of Algerian Workers -
Geography of Algeria -
Ghardaia -
Sid Ahmed Ghozali -
Gildo -
Groupe d'Intervention Spécial -
Guelb El-Kebir massacre -
Guelma -
Guemar -
Masinissa Guermah

H
 -
Hammadid -
Hamoud Boualem -
Mohamed Hardi -
Harki -
Hassan Hattab -
Haouch Khemisti massacre -
Hassan Hattab -
Hayreddin Barbarossa -
Heads of government of Algeria -
Heads of state of Algeria -
Hiempsal I -
Hiempsal II -
Banu Hilal -
Hippo Regius -
History of Algeria -
History of Algeria since 1962 -
History of the Jews in Algeria -
Hocine Achiou -
Hocine Aït Ahmed -
Hocine Soltani -
Hocine Ziani -
Abdelkader Hachani -
Messali Hadj -
Fodhil Hadjadj -
Louisa Hanoune -
Moulay Heddou

I
Ibadi -
Ibrahim ibn Faïd -
Ahmed Taleb Ibrahimi -
Ifriqiya -
Iler -
Illizi -
Islam in Algeria -
Islamic Renaissance Movement -
Islamic Salvation Front

J
Jaza'iranaa -
Jijel -
Juba I of Numidia -
Juba II -
Jugurtha

K
Kabyle language -
Kabylie -
Kahina -
Ali Kafi -
Karim Ziani -
Mustapha Kartali -
Kasdi Merbah -
Kassaman -
Khaled (musician) -
Khalida Toumi -
Khalifa Airways -
Khenchela -
Korandje language -
Nacereddine Kraouche -
Ksar

L
Laghouat -
Lakhdar Brahimi -
Mohamed Lamari -
Smain Lamari -
Lambaesis -
Lamine Abid -
Languages of Algeria -
Larbaa Nat Iraten -
Mustapha Larfaoui -
Abdelhak Layada -
Bernard-Henri Lévy -
LGBT rights in Algeria (Gay rights) -
Liamine Zéroual -
List of Algerians -
List of Algerian massacres of the 1990s -
List of Algerian writers -
List of armed groups in the Algerian Civil War -
List of cities in Algeria -
List of Kings of Mauretania -
List of Kings of Numidia -
List of national parks of Algeria -
List of Pasha and Dey of Algiers -
List of people on stamps of Algeria -
List of political parties in Algeria -
Lounés Bendahmane -
Lyès Deriche

M
M'hamed Bou Qobrine -
Maamar Bettayeb -
Madani Abbassi -
Maghreb -
Maghreb toponymy -
Mahmoud Bendali -
Redha Malek -
Cheb Mami -
Maamar Mamouni -
Yazid Mansouri -
Mascezel -
Masinissa -
Jacques Massu -
Matoub Lounes -
Mauretania -
Mauretania Caesariensis -
Mauretania Tingitana -
Medea, Algeria -
Medea Province -
Mohamed Aïchaoui -
Mohamed Allalou -
Mohamed Arkab -
 -
 -
Mohamed Boumerdassi -
 -
Mohamed Charef -
Mohamed Deriche -
 -
Mohamed Flissi -
 -
Mohamed Larbi Zitout -
Mohamed Mechkarini -
Mohamed Mediene -
Mohamed Saïd Benzekri -
Mohamed Samraoui -
 -
Mers-el-Kébir -
Rachid Mesli -
Messaoud Aït Abderrahmane -
Aïssa Messaoudi -
Bellemou Messaoud -
Hicham Mezair -
Mila Province -
Military of Algeria -
Min Jibalina -
Mohamed Missouri -
M'Sila -
Mohamed Ben Ahmed Abdelghani -
Mohamed Seghir Boushaki -
 -
Mokhtar Hasbellaoui -
Monica of Hippo -
 -
 -
Mostaganem -
Mostaganem Province -
Ahlam Mosteghanemi -
Mozabite -
Mount Chenoua - 
Moussa Ag Amastan -
Movement for Democracy in Algeria -
Movement for National Reform -
Movement of National Understanding -
Movement of Society for Peace -
Muaskar -
Music of Algeria -
Mustapha Ishak Boushaki -
Mustapha Toumi

N
Naâma Province -
Naftal -
Nassim Akrour -
Nationalism and resistance in Algeria -
National Liberation Army -
National Liberation Front (Algeria) -
National Rally for Democracy -
National Republican Alliance -
Khaled Nezzar -
Lotfi Nezzar -
1990 African Nations Cup -
North Africa during the Classical Period -
Noureddine Melikechi -
 -
Numidia

O
Omaria massacre -
Operation Torch -
Oran -
Organisation armée secrète -
Organisation of Young Free Algerians -
Abdelnacer Ouadah -
Ouargla -
Ouarkziz crater -
Oued Bouaicha massacre -
Oued El-Had and Mezouara massacre -
Oum el-Bouaghi -
Ahmed Ouyahia

P
Party of Algerian Renewal -
People's National Army (Algeria's Land Army of Algerian People's Military) -
Petite Kabylie -
Pied-noir -
Provinces of Algeria -
Politics of Algeria -
Prehistory of Central North Africa -
President of Algeria -
Prime Minister of Algeria -
Ptolemy of Mauretania

Q

R
 -
Rabah Rahmoune -
Rachad -
Rachid Deriche -
Rachid Mimouni -
Rachid Nadji -
Raï -
Rais massacre -
Rally for Culture and Democracy -
 -
Reggane -
Relizane -
Revolutionary Committee of Unity and Action -
Rezki Zerarti -
Rise of Islam in Algeria -
Rustamid

S
Saïd Sadi -
Sahara -
Sahara Desert (ecoregion) -
Sahara Airlines (Algeria) -
Saharan rock art -
Saïda Province -
Salah Bouchatal -
Salem Anou -
 -
Samir Zaoui -
School for Islamic Youth - 
Scouts Musulmans Algériens -
Second Barbary War -
Serkadji prison mutiny -
Sétif -
Sétif massacre -
Sidi Abd al-Rahman al-Tha'alibi -
 -
Sidi Bel Abbes -
Sidi Boushaki -
Sid El-Antri massacre -
Abdelmadjid Sidi Said -
Sidi-Daoud, Algeria -
Sidi Daoud massacre -
Sidi-Hamed massacre -
Si-Zerrouk massacre -
Skikda -
Slimane Raho -
Smaïl Bouarous -
Smart Link Communication -
Socialist Forces Front -
Socialist Vanguard Party (Algeria) -
Socialist Workers' Party (Algeria) -
Sonatrach -
Sonelgaz -
 -
Souhane -
Souhane massacre -
Souk Ahras -
Special Organisation (Algeria) -
Star of North Africa -
Status of religious freedom in Algeria -
Syphax

T
Tabelbala -
Tagaste -
Tadjena massacre -
Rachid Taha -
Tahert -
Talemzane crater -
Tamanghasset -
Tarek Boushaki -
Tassili Airlines -
Tassili n'Ajjer -
Tebessa -
Tenes massacre -
Tetuani -
Thalit massacre -
Tiaret -
Timeline of the Algerian Civil War -
Timgad -
Tin Atanal -
Tin Bider crater -
Tindouf -
Tin Hinan -
Tipasa -
Tissemsilt -
Tizi Ouzou -
Tlemcen -
Touila -
Transnational issues of Algeria -
Transport in Algeria -
Transportation in Algeria -
Trans-Saharan trade -
Tuareg -
Tuareg languages

U

V
Vandal -
20 ans, barakat! -
Visa policy of Algeria

W
Wafaa - Water supply and sanitation in Algeria -
West Saharan montane xeric woodlands -
Wilayah -
Wilaya of Relizane massacres of 30 December 1997 -
Wilaya of Relizane massacres of 4 January 1998 -
Workers' Party (Algeria)

X

Y
Antar Yahia -
Kateb Yacine -
Yahia Boushaki

Z
Zenata -
Zindalii -
Zinedine Zidane -
Zinedine Ferhat -
Zirid

List of Unedited Articles

Rivers and lakes: Chott Melrhir, Mazafran, Oued El Harrach, Chiffa, Isser, Sebaou, Daas, Soummam, El Malah, El Hammam, Mekkera, Tafna, Chott Chergui, Seybouse River, Rhumel, Medjerda, Cheliff, Zahrez, Chott el Hodna, Moulouya

Towns: Messad, Hennchir Besseriani, Bir el Ater, Miliana, Sidi Fredj/Sidi Ferruch

Areas: Hodna, M'zab, Ouarsenis, Mitidja, Nemencha, Dahra, Tidikelt, Titteri

Prehistory: Ibero-Maurusian, Mechta-Afalou, Protomediterranean

Classical period: Revolt of the Mercenaries, Cuicul

Medieval period: Uqba ibn Nafi, Abu al Muhajir Dinar, Kusayla, Ibrahim ibn al Aghlab, Abd ar Rahman ibn Rustam, Qalaat Beni Hammad, Banu Sulaym, Grand Mosque of Tilimsan, Zayyanid, Bani Abd el Wad

Post-medieval period: Aruj, Ahmed Bey ben Mohamed Chérif, Muhyi ad Din (father of Emir Abdelkader)

Colonial period: Louis de Lamoricière, communes de plein exercice, communes indigènes, Ministry of Algerian Affairs, beni-oui-oui, Adolphe Crémieux, Auguste Warnier, Jules Cambon, Jeunesse Algérienne, Jonnart Law, Khalid ibn Hashim, Party of the Algerian People, Federation of Elected Natives, Abd al Hamid Ben Badis, Algerian Muslim Congress, Mohamed Bendjelloul, Viollette Plan, Georges Catroux, ratissage, Movement for the Triumph of Democratic Liberties, Organic Statute of Algeria, Larbi Ben M'Hidi, Mourad Didouch, Moustafa Ben Boulaid, Mohamed Khider, External Delegation in Cairo

Sports: Mouloudia, JS Kabylie

Writers: Jean Amrouche, Marguerite Taos Amrouche, Rachid Boudjedra, Mouloud Feraoun, Mouloud Mammeri, Rachid Mimouni, Leila Sebbar, Jean Sénac

Politics: Ali Belhadj, Abdelhamid Mehri

See also

 Lists of country-related topics

 
Algeria